Natalie Davis may refer to:

Natalie Zemon Davis, American historian
Natalie Davis, known as The Miniature Killer, a fictional serial killer from U.S. TV series CSI: Crime Scene Investigation
Natalie Davis, 2011 Miss Minnesota winner